Densignathus is an extinct genus of early stem-tetrapod from the Late Devonian of Pennsylvania in the United States. A lower jaw has been found from the Red Hill fossil site, which is known for a diversity of lobe-finned fishes and other early tetrapods like Hynerpeton. The type species, Densignathus rowei, was named in honor of paleontologist Norman Douglas Rowe in 2000.

References 

Prehistoric tetrapod genera
Devonian tetrapods
Late Devonian animals
Devonian animals of North America
Natural history of Pennsylvania
Ichthyostegalia
Fossil taxa described in 2000